The TM-72 is a Soviet cylindrical metal-cased anti-tank mine. It is normally used with the MVN-72 or MVN-80 magnetic influence fuzes, which give it a full width attack capability. It uses a 2.5 kg shaped charge warhead capable of penetrating approximately 100 millimeters of armor at a standoff distance of between 0.25 and 0.5 meters. It is compatible with the fuzes used with the TM-62 series of mines.

References

 
 

Anti-tank mines
Land mines of the Soviet Union